The Federação Tocantinense de Futebol (English: Football Association of Tocantins state) was founded on April 7, 1990, and it manages all the official football tournaments within the state of Tocantins, which include the Campeonato Tocantinense and the Copa Tocantins, and represents the clubs at the Brazilian Football Confederation (CBF). Politician Leomar Quintanilha is the president of the organization since its foundation.

References

Tocantinense
Football in Tocantins
1990 establishments in Brazil
Sports organizations established in 1990